Manariitehauroo Porlier (born 1 December 1989) is a Tahitian footballer currently playing for A.S. Tiare Tahiti. He is a member of Tahiti national football team.

International career
Porlier made his debut for the senior team during the 2012 OFC Nations Cup. He appeared in two matches as a substitute.

Honours

International
OFC Nations Cup:
 Winner (1): 2012

International career statistics

External links

http://www.zerozero.pt/jogador.php?id=266599&epoca_id=0&search=1

1989 births
Living people
French Polynesian footballers
Tahiti international footballers
Association football forwards
2012 OFC Nations Cup players